Terry Waites (born 28 April 1933) was an Australian rules footballer who played for Collingwood in the Victorian Football League (VFL) during the 1950s.

A product of Scotch College, Waites was a centre half forward in Collingwood's 1953 premiership team, in just his seventh VFL match.

References

Holmesby, Russell and Main, Jim (2007). The Encyclopedia of AFL Footballers. 7th ed. Melbourne: Bas Publishing.

1933 births
Australian rules footballers from Victoria (Australia)
Collingwood Football Club players
Collingwood Football Club Premiership players
Old Scotch Football Club players
Living people
People educated at Scotch College, Melbourne
One-time VFL/AFL Premiership players